The Orra Marina is a 31-floor tower in the Dubai Marina in Dubai, United Arab Emirates. Construction of Orra Marina was completed in 2012.

See also 
 List of buildings in Dubai

External links
Orra Marina on Emporis

Residential skyscrapers in Dubai